Pinelawn is a railroad station along the Main Line (Ronkonkoma Branch) of the Long Island Rail Road. It is on Long Island Avenue, east of the Suffolk County Road 3 (Wellwood Avenue) grade crossing in East Farmingdale, New York.

Pinelawn serves mostly off-peak local trains daily. Approximately 36 trains currently stop at the station every week. This station currently sees no late night or peak service.

History
The Pinelawn station originally had two different station houses with their own histories. Both were created to serve Pinelawn Cemetery, Wellwood Cemetery, and other cemeteries in the vicinity. The first station opened as a flag stop on the northeast corner of Wellwood Avenue in 1895 as Melville, a name it maintained until 1897. From there it would be named Pinelawn (Melville) and finally Pinelawn in 1899.

The second station was built in 1915, and moved to the southeast side of Wellwood Avenue in 1925. It was remodeled again in June, 1979, but only as a shelter. Despite nearly being eliminated as part of the Long Island Rail Road's electrification of the main line towards Ronkonkoma, along with Wyandanch, and Brentwood, the station was saved as part of a bipartisan effort by New York State Senator Owen Johnson (R-West Babylon) and Assemblyman Patrick Halpin (D-Lindenhurst), and given a high-level platform in 1986.

As part of the Main Line Second Track Project which built a second track between Farmingdale and Ronkonkoma, the LIRR constructed two new platforms at Pinelawn. The existing station building was demolished, allowing construction of a second platform.

Station layout

This station has two tracks and two 2-car-long side platforms. South of Platform B is a small drop off area with six parking spaces.

Pinelawn Cemetery station
Despite the presence of the shack-sized station, a much more elaborate station was built across Wellwood Avenue on August 30, 1904. The station had a tall clock tower, a cemetery office, a chapel, and a fancy ticket office in the main lobby, however it is widely believed never to have been used by the public. Pinelawn Cemetery station remained in service for a business located within the cemetery, until it was destroyed by a fire in April 1928. The walls of the station were still standing in 1960, and the arched entrance to this station remained intact until 1985, when the Long Island Rail Road was beginning its electrification of the main line.

References

External links 

LIRR Pinelawn (TrainsAreFun.com)
 Station from Google Maps Street View

Long Island Rail Road stations in Suffolk County, New York
Railway stations in the United States opened in 1895